The Trinidad and Tobago national badminton team represents Trinidad and Tobago in international badminton team competitions. It is managed by the Trinidad & Tobago Badminton Association. Trinidad and Tobago were hosts of the 2018 Pan Am Badminton Championships and were qualified into the tournament as host nation.

The men's team finished in 7th place while the women's team finished 5th. The Trinidadian and Tobagonian team competed in the Pan American Games. The nation won a bronze in badminton at the Pan Am Games.

Participation in Pan American Badminton Championships

Men's team
{| class="wikitable"
|-
! Year !! Result
|-
|style="border: 3px solid red"| 2018 || 7th place
|}Women's team'''

Participation in Pan American Games

List of medalists

Current squad 

Men
Nicholas Bonkowsky
Nathaniel Khillawan
Naim Mohammed
Rahul Rampersad
Anil Seepaul
Renaldo Sinanan
Justin Sui

Women
Nekeisha Blake
Chequeda de Boulet
Jade Joseph
Avril Marcelle
Kerian Quan Chee
Kamasha Robertson
Latoya Walrond

References

Badminton
National badminton teams
Badminton in Trinidad and Tobago